Aaron Williamson (born 4 June 1992) is a British racing driver who competed in the British Touring Car Championship in 2012. He later returned to the Renault Clio Cup United Kingdom in 2013.

Racing career
Williamson began his career in the SAXMAX Saloon Car Championship in 2006. He switched to the Ginetta Junior Championship for 2008, taking several top 10 finishes on his way to finishing thirteenth overall, with 189 points,. He joined Muzz Racing for the 2009 Ginetta Junior Championship season, ending the season third in the standings with three victories. Williamson went on to race for Century Motorsport in the 2010 Ginetta G50 Cup season, after the first three rounds, he switched to FML from round six onwards. He ended the season eleventh in the championship standings. He stayed with FML for the 2011 Ginetta GT Supercup season, where he ended second in the G50 Cup class standings. In September 2012, it was announced that Williamson would make his British Touring Car Championship debut with Team HARD. replacing Howard Fuller He finished 14th in the first race, before retiring from race two and not starting race three.

Racing record

Complete British Touring Car Championship results
(key) (Races in bold indicate pole position – 1 point awarded just in first race; races in italics indicate fastest lap – 1 point awarded all races; * signifies that driver led race for at least one lap – 1 point given all races)

24 Hours of Silverstone results

References

External links
 

1992 births
Living people
British racing drivers
British Touring Car Championship drivers
Britcar 24-hour drivers
Renault UK Clio Cup drivers
Ginetta GT4 Supercup drivers
Ginetta Junior Championship drivers